The African green bee-eater (Merops viridissimus) is a species of bird in the family Meropidae.
It is found throughout arid regions of Africa from Senegal east to Ethiopia, and has expanded its range north to Egypt over the past few decades.

Taxonomy 
Although initially described as distinct species, the African and Arabian (M. cyanophrys) green bee-eaters were grouped with the Asian green bee-eater (M. orientalis) as the green bee-eater by Charles Sibley and Burt Monroe in 1990. However, in 2014, the IUCN Red List and BirdLife International again split them as distinct species. A 2020 study found significant differences in morphology and voice between all three species, so they were also split from one another by the International Ornithologists' Union in 2021.

There are thought to be three subspecies:

 M. v. viridissimus: most of Africa from Senegal east to Ethiopia
 M. v. flavoviridis: Chad to eastern Sudan
 M. v. cleopatra: northern Sudan and Nile Valley of Egypt

A 2004 phylogenetic analysis based on plumage recovered the M. viridissimus as sister to M. orientalis, with the clade containing both being sister to M. cyanophrys. However, the IOC classifies it as sister to cyanophrys.

Description 
The most distinctive trait of this species is its light yellowish-green throat, in contrast to the blue throats of M. orientalis and M. cyanophrys. It also differs in its voice.

Distribution 
It is found throughout semiarid regions of Africa, its distribution roughly coinciding with the Sahel. It ranges from coast to coast, reaching its eastern extent in Senegal and western extent in Ethiopia. The species has taken advantage of changes to agriculture and increased irrigation in this region, and has thus increased in abundance, expanding its range along the Nile. It colonized Egypt prior to 2001 and now ranges as far north as the Nile Delta. Due to this increasing population and it benefiting from human habitat modification, it is not thought to be under threat.

References

African green bee-eater
Birds of West Africa
African green bee-eater
Taxa named by William John Swainson